Commuter 23 is the eighth studio album by British Synth-pop band Blancmange, released in 2016. The album reached No. 38 in the UK Independent Albums Chart.

In December 2016, the album was followed by the EP Red Shift, which features a reworking of four tracks from Commuter 23: "Red Shift", "Judge Mental", "Jack Knife" and "Last Night (I Dreamt I Had a Job)".

Critical reception

Upon release, Graeme Marsh of MusicOMH commented: "Whilst Nil by Mouth was entirely instrumental, Commuter 23 walks a similar path but this time adds back in the odd vocal here and there. It dabbles in ambience and experimentation as before, as well as minimalism, synth soundscapes and occasional downright weirdness but with – in the main – a more humane feel." Paul Scott-Bates of Louder Than War wrote: "Commuter 23 sees Blancmange continue to mature. As Arthur continues well into his fifties, so the music develops beyond the perfect pop of the 80s and further into a more comfortable sounding, often experimental phase."

Ian Shirley of Record Collector described Commuter 23 as a "compelling earful [and] musically a wide-ranging collection". Thomas H Green of The Arts Desk commented that the album had a "classy retro-futurism, in the same way that OMD's last album English Electric did. Blancmange now successfully mine a territory somewhere between John Foxx, Kraftwerk and 1990s post-clubbing analogue ambience."

Track listing

Chart performance

Personnel
 Neil Arthur - lead vocals, keyboards, recording, mixing, artwork
 Joe Caithness - mastering

Other
 Adam Yeldham - artwork
 Helen Kincaid - asteroid painting
 Steve Malins - management

References

2016 albums
Blancmange (band) albums